Nitin Paul Dhiman is an Indian – American physician and former professional basketball player. He is 6 ft 3 in tall and plays guard. He has played professionally in the Dominican Republic in the Baloncesto Superior de Santo Domingo, the American Basketball Association (ABA), and the NBA Southern California Summer Pro League.

Early life
Dhiman was born on July 24, 1980, in Overland Park, Kansas to immigrants from Punjab, India. He attended and played high school basketball at The Pembroke Hill School in Kansas City, Missouri winning two Missouri 2A state championships along with future NBA players JaRon Rush and Kareem Rush. Pembroke Hill was ranked #24 in the country by Street and Smith's College Basketball. Dhiman led the team in three-point field goal percentage at 44%. The state titles were eventually stripped after his AAU Coach Myron Piggie pled guilty to a conspiracy charge for paying $35,500 to high school players on his Kansas City-based team from 1996 to 1998. The players included JaRon Rush, Kareem Rush, Corey Maggette, Korleone Young; and Andre Williams.

Education and medical career
Dhiman fulfilled basic educational requirements at Johnson County Community College in Overland Park, Kansas, but was not part of the basketball team. In the fall of 1999, he enrolled at the Universidad Iberoamericana (UNIBE) School of Medicine in Santo Domingo, Dominican Republic and graduated in March 2005. He completed a rotating internship at Good Samaritan Hospital in Aguadilla, Puerto Rico and residency at Brookdale University Hospital and Medical Center in Brooklyn, New York. Dhiman is board certified in internal medicine.

Basketball career
College: After graduating high school from Pembroke Hill Dhiman received interest to play collegiate basketball at Depauw, Missouri, and University of Missouri–Kansas City but was not offered a scholarship. Instead he attended Universidad Iberoamericana (UNIBE) in Santo Domingo, Dominican Republic, where he was a standout guard on the basketball team. From 1999 to 2003 Dhiman scored 2,334 points and became the school's all-time leading scorer and set numerous school scoring records.

Professional: In 2002, Dhiman was added midseason to Villa Francisca of the National District Superior Basketball League of the Dominican Republic.

For the 2004 season, Dhiman signed with Ivan Guzman Klang (I.G.K.) in the Baloncesto Superior de Santo Domingo. He averaged 15.4 points and was named to the all-star team his rookie season and won the three point contest. In 2005, Dhiman returned to the United States and played at the NBA Summer League led by former NBA center Olden Polynice. The following season he was signed to a free agent deal to the ABA's San Diego Wildcats. Former NBA Co-rookie of the year, Bill Tosheff, served as Dhiman's agent.

During the 2006 season, Dhiman returned to I.G.K. in the Dominican Republic but missed two weeks due to an eye injury. In July 2007, Dhiman teamed with former NBA player Steffond Johnson at the NBA Summer Pro League in Los Angeles. After a brief hiatus to continue his medical practice, Dhiman again competed at the 2012 NBA Summer Pro League in Los Angeles while playing for former NBA veteran Jerry Reynolds. In  2013, Dhiman joined sports ministry, Athletes in Action, to compete on an exhibition tour against collegiate and professional teams in Puerto Rico.

Personal life
Dhiman speaks fluent English and Spanish.

2002: Villa Francisca 
2004: I.G.K. 
2005: NBA  Summer League 
2006: ABA: San Diego Wildcats 
2006–2007: I.G.K. 
2007: NBA Summer League 
2012: Southern California Summer Pro League 
2013: AIA

Career highlights
2004 All-Star – Baloncesto Superior de Santo Domingo
2004 All-Rookie Team – Baloncesto Superior de Santo Domingo
2004 Three-Point Shootout Champion – Baloncesto Superior de Santo Domingo
2006 Three-Point Shootout Champion – Baloncesto Superior de Santo Domingo

College statistics

|-
| style="text-align:left;"| 1999–2000
| style="text-align:left;"| Iberoamerican University 
| 30 || 30 || 39.1 || 48.3 || 39.7 || 72.5 || 2.0 || 4.2 || 2.0 || 0.1  || 21.0
|-
| style="text-align:left;"| 2000–2001
| style="text-align:left;"| Iberoamerican University
| 30 || 30 || 36.4 || 48.8 || 43.7 || 80.0 || 2.3 || 3.9 || 2.1 || 0.0  || 19.9
|-
| style="text-align:left;"| 2001–2002
| style="text-align:left;"| Iberoamerican University
| 30|| 30 || 37.3 || 48.8 || 41.9 || 90.3 || 2.3 || 3.7 || 1.9 || 0.1  || 19.8
|-
| style="text-align:left;"| 2002–2003
| style="text-align:left;"| Iberoamerican University
| 30 || 30 || 34.8 || 47.6 || 38.6 || 84.2 || 1.7 || 3.1 || 2.1 || 0.0  || 17.1
|-
 
| style="text-align:left;"|  
| style="text-align:left;"|  Total
| 120 || 120 || 36.9 || 48.4 || 41.0 || 80.7 || 2.1 || 3.8 || 2.0 || 0.1  || 19.4

Professional statistics

|-
| style="text-align:left;"|  2002
| style="text-align:left;"| Villa Francisca 
| 21|| 1 || 18.3 || 43.9 || 40.4 || 85.7 || 1.6 || 2.4 || 0.7 || 0.0  || 11.8
|-
| style="text-align:left;"|  2004
| style="text-align:left;"| I.G.K.
| 25|| 22 || 24.2 || 46.7 || 40.0 || 81.4 || 1.7 || 2.5 || 1.2 || 0.1  || 15.7
|-
| style="text-align:left;"| 2006
| style="text-align:left;"| I.G.K.
| 25 || 18 || 24.4 || 46.4 || 44.9 || 86.1 || 0.9 || 2.1 || 1.5 || 0.0  || 13.2
|-
| style="text-align:left;"| 2006
| style="text-align:left;"| San Diego Wildcats
| 3 || 1 || 20.3 || 41.7 || 38.4 || – || 2.0 || 1.3 || 1.0 || 0.0 || 8.3
|-
| style="text-align:left;"| 2013
| style="text-align:left;"| AIA
| 5 || 3 || 19.6 || 52.6 || 57.1 || 66.7 || 1.0 || 1.6 || 1.4 || 0.0  || 9.2

References

1980 births
Living people
21st-century American physicians
Basketball players from Kansas City, Missouri
Shooting guards
American expatriate basketball people in the Dominican Republic
American men's basketball players
Physicians from New York City
Universidad Iberoamericana (UNIBE) alumni
American people of Punjabi descent